John Keith Hewitt (born July 14, 1952) is a British-American behavioral geneticist and professor of psychology and neuroscience at the University of Colorado Boulder, where he directs the Institute for Behavioral Genetics. He became a naturalized citizen of the United States in 1996.

Career
Hewitt is the editor of the journal Behavior Genetics and past president of the Behavior Genetics Association. He received the Dobzhansky Award of the Behavioral Genetics Association in 2008 and the James Shields Award of the International Society for Twin Studies in 2016.

References

External links
John K. Hewitt Institute for Behavioral Genetics

1952 births
Living people
English psychologists
Behavior geneticists
Alumni of the University of Birmingham
Alumni of the University of London
University of Colorado Boulder faculty
Academic journal editors
English emigrants to the United States